Rashaad Reynolds (born February 2, 1991) is a former American football cornerback. He played college football at Oregon State.

High school career
Reynolds attended San Fernando High School in San Fernando, California, where he played both quarterback and cornerback. He earned All-Valley Mission League three times and was twice named the league’s MVP. As a senior, he threw for 1,566 yards and 13 touchdowns, and added 663 yards and eight touchdowns rushing. As a junior, he threw for approximately 1,500 yards and 15 touchdowns, and rushed 600 yards and six touchdowns. He also wrestled at San Fernando, winning the city championship four times.

He was considered a three-star recruit by Rivals.com.

College career
Reynolds attended Oregon State University from 2009 to 2013. During his career he started 38 of 50 games, recording 218 tackles, 10 interceptions and one sack. In his final college game, he was the MVP of the 2013 Hawaii Bowl after returning two fumble recoveries for touchdowns.

Professional career

Jacksonville Jaguars
Following the 2014 NFL Draft, Reynolds was signed by the Jacksonville Jaguars as an undrafted free agent. The Jaguars placed Reynolds on injured reserve on August 29, 2014, with a broken hand.

He was released on September 4, 2015 and signed to the practice squad on September 17.

Detroit Lions
On August 10, 2016, Reynolds signed with the Detroit Lions. On August 29, 2016, Reynolds was waived by the Lions.

Chicago Bears
On December 28, 2016, Reynolds was signed to the Bears' practice squad. He signed a reserve/future contract with the Bears on January 3, 2017. He was waived on September 2, 2017.

References

External links
Oregon State Beavers bio

1991 births
Living people
Players of American football from Los Angeles
American football cornerbacks
Oregon State University alumni
Oregon State Beavers football players
Jacksonville Jaguars players
Chicago Bears players